Lake Albanel is located east of Lake Mistassini and covers a total area of approximately . It is located in the region of Jamésie. Quebec Route 167 ends beside this lake. It is entirely located in the protected area of Lacs-Albanel-Mistassini-et-Waconichi.

Formation theory
In 2016, it was reported that the arc shaped lake, together with nearby Lake Mistassini, may have been formed by a large meteor impact about 2.1 billion years ago. The rest of the 500 km diameter crater is thought to have now been mostly eroded away or buried but geological indications of a major impact have been found in the rocks around the lake. If confirmed this would be the largest impact crater found on the earth.

Etymology 
Lake Albanel is named in honour of Charles Albanel who discovered it in 1672.

Geography 
The main hydrographic slopes near Lake Albanel are:
 North side: Mistassini Lake, Chéno River, Pépeshquasati River, Neilson River (Pépeshquasati River), Wabissinane River;
 East side: Témiscamie River, Chalifour River, Perdue River (Témiscamie River), Témiscamie Lake;
 South side: Chalifour River, Nestaocano River;
 West side: Mistassini Lake, Rupert River, Wabissinane River.

Main islands

Peninsulas, caps and bays

Access roads 
The eastern sector of Lac Mistassini (including the village of Mistissini (Cree village municipality) and the hamlet Rivière-Chalifour) is accessible from Chibougamau by route 167. This road goes north to the east shore of Albanel Lake. Some secondary forest roads connect to this main road.

See also 

List of lakes of Quebec
List of protected areas of Quebec
Albanel, Quebec

References

External links 
 Portrait de la réserve faunique des Lacs-Albanel-Mistassini-et-Waconichi

Lakes of Nord-du-Québec